The bufflehead (Bucephala albeola) is a small sea duck of the genus Bucephala, the goldeneyes. This species was first described by Carl Linnaeus in his landmark 1758 10th edition of Systema Naturae as Anas albeola.

The genus name is derived from ancient Greek boukephalos, "bullheaded", from bous, "bull", and kephale, "head", a reference to the oddly bulbous head shape of the species. The species name albeola is from Latin albus, "white". The English name is a combination of buffalo and head, again referring to the head shape. This is most noticeable when the male puffs out the feathers on the head, thus greatly increasing the apparent size of the head.

Description
The bufflehead has a wingspan of 21.6 in (55 cm).

Adult males are striking black and white, with iridescent green and purple heads and a large white patch behind the eye. Females are grey-toned with a smaller white patch behind the eye and a light underside.

Distribution and habitat
They are migratory and most of them winter in protected coastal waters, or open inland waters, on the east and west coasts of North America and the southern United States. They can also be observed wintering on the Great Lakes. The bufflehead is an extremely rare vagrant to western Europe. Their breeding habitat is wooded lakes and ponds in Alaska and Canada, almost entirely included in the boreal forest or taiga habitat. From 1966 - 2015, the bufflehead experienced a >1.5% yearly population increase throughout its breeding range.

Behavior

Buffleheads have evolved their small size to fit the nesting cavity of their "metabiotic" host, a woodpecker, the northern flicker. Due to their small size, they are highly active, undertaking dives almost continuously while sustained by their high metabolism. They do not tend to collect in large flocks; groups are usually limited to small numbers. One duck serves as a sentry, watching for predators as the others in the group dive in search of food. Buffleheads are amongst the last waterfowl to leave their breeding grounds and one of the world's most punctual migrants, arriving on their wintering grounds within a narrow margin of time.

Breeding
Buffleheads are monogamous, and the females may return to the same nest site, year after year. They nest in cavities in trees, primarily aspens or poplars, using mostly old flicker nests, close (usually < ) to water. Nest competitors include mountain bluebird (Sialia currucoides), tree swallow (Tachycineta bicolor), and European starling. There was one recorded instance of a female Barrow's goldeneye killing a bufflehead adult female and her brood. Smaller cavities are preferred because of less competition with the larger goldeneyes. Females may be killed on the nest by mammals, such as foxes (Vulpes and Urocyon sp.), weasels (Mustela and Neogale sp.) or mink (Neogale vison), and by goldeneyes over nest competition.

Average clutch size is nine (range six to 11), and eggs average . Incubation averages 30 days, and nest success is high (79% in one study) compared to ground-nesting species like the teal. A day after the last duckling hatches, the brood leaps from the nest cavity. The young fledge at 50–55 days of age. Predators of adults include the peregrine falcon (Falco peregrinus), snowy owl (Bubo scandiacus), bald eagle (Haliaeetus leucocephalus), golden eagle (Aquila chrysaetos), red-tailed hawk (Buteo jamaicensis), great horned owl (Bubo virginianus), and Cooper's hawk (Accipiter cooperii).

Diet
These diving birds forage underwater. In freshwater habitats, they eat primarily insects, and in saltwater, they feed predominantly on crustaceans and mollusks. Aquatic plants and fish eggs can often become locally important food items, as well.

Relationship with humans
Because of their striking plumage, highly active nature, and proximity to humans on waterfront properties, buffleheads are one of the most popular birds amongst bird watchers. The bufflehead, also known as the spirit duck, was added to the coat of arms of the town of Sidney, British Columbia, in 1995. Buffleheads are hunted and are considered a gamebird. In contrast to many other seaducks that have declined in recent decades, bufflehead numbers have remained relatively constant. Habitat degradation is the major threat to this bird, since they depend on very limited coastal habitat on their wintering grounds, and very specific habitat in their boreal breeding grounds. Although buffleheads do use man-made nest boxes, they still need the forest habitat to thrive.

References

External links
Bufflehead at Birds of North America Online
BirdWeb.Org: Bufflehead
Bufflehead at Boreal Birds
Buffleheads in Winter Birdnote Archives, KPLU, 7 Dec 2009.
 Bufflehead Species Account – Cornell Lab of Ornithology
 Bufflehead – Bucephala albeola – USGS Patuxent Bird Identification InfoCenter
 
 
 

Bucephala (bird)
Native birds of Alaska
Birds of Canada
Native birds of the Northwestern United States
Birds described in 1758
Taxa named by Carl Linnaeus